Earl Scranton Duvall (June 20, 1899 – August 6, 1966) was an American football player. He played college football for Ohio University as a fullback.  While in college, he joined Sigma Pi fraternity.  As a professional, he played at the guard, tackle, and end positions in the National Football League (NFL) for the Columbus Tigers from 1924 to 1926. He appeared in 21 NFL games, 14 as a starter.

After football, Duvall would become vice president of the State Automobile Insurance Company and was a member of the Ohio University Alumni Association and the Jacques Club.

References

1899 births
1966 deaths
Columbus Tigers players
Players of American football from Ohio
Ohio Bobcats football players